Brixen is the name of two cities in the Alps:

Brixen, South Tyrol, Italy
Brixen im Thale, Tyrol, Austria

Brixen may also refer to:
Bishopric of Brixen, the former north-Italian state.